Colletotrichum (sexual stage: Glomerella) is a genus of fungi that are symbionts to plants as endophytes (living within the plant) or phytopathogens. Many of the species in this genus are plant pathogens, but some species may have a mutualistic relationship with hosts.

History 
The history of the Colletotrichum genus is a case study on the tension between the lumpers and splitters. While the genus Colletotrichum was first proposed in 1831, the exact definition of Colletotrichum and the species that belong in this genus has been in flux ever since. The biggest recent shift has been from a definition (of both the genus and the species within it) based on morphology to a definition based on a combination of morphology and molecular phylogenetics. The use of molecular phylogenetics has led to a huge increase in the number of recognized species in this genus, and the species are now organized into species complexes that usually have the name of their most widely known species. The name of a species when referring its namesake species complex will often have the suffix s.l. or sensu lato (in the broad sense) while that same name when referring to the specific species within the species complex will have the suffix of s.s. or sensu stricto (in the strict sense).

The most recent assessment of this genus identifies 248 species, most of which are categorized into 14 species complexes. If history is any indicator of the future, then the list of species complexes and species within this genus will continue to be redefined and reorganized as more information becomes available.

Species and species complexes

Colletotrichum acutatum species complex  

Colletotrichum abscissum
Colletotrichum acerbum
Colletotrichum acutatum sensu stricto
Colletotrichum arboricola
Colletotrichum australe
Colletotrichum brisbanense
Colletotrichum cairnsense
Colletotrichum carthami
Colletotrichum chrysanthemi
Colletotrichum citri
Colletotrichum cosmi
Colletotrichum costaricense
Colletotrichum cuscutae
Colletotrichum eriobotryae
Colletotrichum fioriniae
Colletotrichum godetiae
Colletotrichum guajavae
Colletotrichum indonesiense
Colletotrichum javanense
Colletotrichum johnstonii
Colletotrichum kinghornii
Colletotrichum laticiphilum
Colletotrichum lauri
Colletotrichum limetticola
Colletotrichum lupini
Colletotrichum melonis
Colletotrichum nymphaeae
Colletotrichum paranaense
Colletotrichum paxtonii
Colletotrichum phormii
Colletotrichum pyricola
Colletotrichum rhombiforme
Colletotrichum roseum
Colletotrichum salicis
Colletotrichum scovillei
Colletotrichum simmondsii
Colletotrichum sloanei
Colletotrichum tamarilloi
Colletotrichum walleri
Colletotrichum wanningense

Colletotrichum agaves species complex  
Colletotrichum agaves sensu stricto

Colletotrichum euphorbiae

Colletotrichum ledebouriae

Colletotrichum neosansevieriae

Colletotrichum sansevieriae

Colletotrichum boninense species complex  
Colletotrichum annellatum

Colletotrichum beeveri

Colletotrichum boninense sensu stricto

Colletotrichum brasiliense

Colletotrichum brassicicola

Colletotrichum camelliae-japonicae

Colletotrichum catinaense

Colletotrichum citricola

Colletotrichum colombiense

Colletotrichum condaoense

Colletotrichum constrictum

Colletotrichum cymbidiicola

Colletotrichum dacrycarpi

Colletotrichum doitungense

Colletotrichum feijoicola

Colletotrichum hippeastri

Colletotrichum karstii

Colletotrichum limonicola

Colletotrichum novae-zelandiae

Colletotrichum oncidii

Colletotrichum parsonsiae

Colletotrichum petchii

Colletotrichum phyllanthi

Colletotrichum torulosum

Colletotrichum watphraense

Colletotrichum dematium species complex  
Colletotrichum anthrisci

Colletotrichum circinans

Colletotrichum dematium sensu stricto

Colletotrichum eryngiicola

Colletotrichum fructi

Colletotrichum hemerocallidis

Colletotrichum insertae

Colletotrichum jinshuiense

Colletotrichum kakivorum

Colletotrichum lineola

Colletotrichum menispermi

Colletotrichum orchidis

Colletotrichum parthenocissicola

Colletotrichum sambucicola

Colletotrichum sedi

Colletotrichum sonchicola

Colletotrichum spinaciae

Colletotrichum destructivum species complex  
Colletotrichum americae-borealis

Colletotrichum antirrhinicola

Colletotrichum atractylodicola

Colletotrichum bryoniicola

Colletotrichum destructivum sensu stricto

Colletotrichum fuscum

Colletotrichum higginsianum

Colletotrichum lentis

Colletotrichum lini

Colletotrichum ocimi

Colletotrichum panacicola

Colletotrichum pisicola

Colletotrichum shisoi

Colletotrichum tabacum

Colletotrichum tanaceti

Colletotrichum utrechtense

Colletotrichum vignae

Colletotrichum dracaenophilum species complex  
Colletotrichum cariniferi

Colletotrichum coelogynes

Colletotrichum dracaenophilum sensu stricto

Colletotrichum excelsum-altitudinum

Colletotrichum parallelophorum

Colletotrichum tongrenense

Colletotrichum tropicicola

Colletotrichum yunnanense

Colletotrichum gigasporum species complex  
Colletotrichum arxii

Colletotrichum chiangraiense

Colletotrichum gigasporum sensu stricto

Colletotrichum jishouense

Colletotrichum magnisporum

Colletotrichum pseudomajus

Colletotrichum radicis

Colletotrichum serranegrense

Colletotrichum vietnamense

Colletotrichum gloeosporioides species complex  
Colletotrichum aenigma

Colletotrichum aeschynomenes

Colletotrichum alatae

Colletotrichum alienum

Colletotrichum aotearoa

Colletotrichum arecicola

Colletotrichum artocarpicola

Colletotrichum asianum

Colletotrichum camelliae

Colletotrichum changpingense

Colletotrichum chrysophillum

Colletotrichum cigarro

Colletotrichum clidemiae

Colletotrichum cobbittiense

Colletotrichum conoides

Colletotrichum cordylinicola

Colletotrichum endophytica

Colletotrichum fragariae

Colletotrichum fructicola

Colletotrichum fructivorum

Colletotrichum gloeosporioides sensu stricto

Colletotrichum grevilleae

Colletotrichum grossum

Colletotrichum hebeiense

Colletotrichum hederiicola

Colletotrichum helleniense

Colletotrichum henanense

Colletotrichum horii

Colletotrichum hystricis

Colletotrichum jiangxiense

Colletotrichum kahawae

Colletotrichum makassarense

Colletotrichum musae

Colletotrichum noveboracense

Colletotrichum nupharicola

Colletotrichum pandanicola

Colletotrichum perseae

Colletotrichum proteae

Colletotrichum pseudotheobromicola

Colletotrichum psidii

Colletotrichum queenslandicum

Colletotrichum rhexiae

Colletotrichum salsolae

Colletotrichum siamense

Colletotrichum syzygiicola

Colletotrichum tainanense

Colletotrichum temperatum

Colletotrichum theobromicola

Colletotrichum ti

Colletotrichum tropicale

Colletotrichum viniferum

Colletotrichum wuxiense

Colletotrichum xanthorrhoeae

Colletotrichum yulongense

Colletotrichum graminicola-caudatum species complex  
Colletotrichum alcornii

Colletotrichum axonopodi

Colletotrichum baltimorense

Colletotrichum caudasporum

Colletotrichum caudatum sensu stricto

Colletotrichum cereale

Colletotrichum duyunensis

Colletotrichum echinochloae

Colletotrichum eleusines

Colletotrichum endophytum

Colletotrichum eremochloae

Colletotrichum falcatum

Colletotrichum graminicola sensu stricto

Colletotrichum hainanense

Colletotrichum hanaui

Colletotrichum jacksonii

Colletotrichum miscanthi

Colletotrichum navitas

Colletotrichum nicholsonii

Colletotrichum ochracea

Colletotrichum paspali

Colletotrichum somersetense

Colletotrichum sublineola

Colletotrichum zoysiae

Colletotrichum magnum species complex  
Colletotrichum brevisporum

Colletotrichum cacao

Colletotrichum liaoningense

Colletotrichum lobatum

Colletotrichum magnum sensu stricto

Colletotrichum merremiae

Colletotrichum okinawense

Colletotrichum panamense

Colletotrichum orbiculare species complex  
Colletotrichum bidentis

Colletotrichum lindemuthianum

Colletotrichum malvarum

Colletotrichum orbiculare sensu stricto

Colletotrichum sidae

Colletotrichum spinosum

Colletotrichum tebeestii

Colletotrichum trifolii

Colletotrichum orchidearum species complex  
Colletotrichum aracearum

Colletotrichum cattleyicola

Colletotrichum cliviicola

Colletotrichum musicola

Colletotrichum orchidearum sensu stricto

Colletotrichum piperis

Colletotrichum plurivorum

Colletotrichum sojae

Colletotrichum vittalense

Colletotrichum spaethianum species complex  
Colletotrichum bletillum

Colletotrichum guizhouensis

Colletotrichum incanum

Colletotrichum lilii

Colletotrichum liriopes

Colletotrichum riograndense

Colletotrichum spaethianum sensu stricto

Colletotrichum tofieldiae

Colletotrichum verruculosum

Colletotrichum truncatum species complex  
Colletotrichum acidae

Colletotrichum curcumae

Colletotrichum fusiforme

Colletotrichum jasminigenum

Colletotrichum truncatum sensu stricto

Singleton species  
Colletotrichum chlorophyti

Colletotrichum coccodes

Colletotrichum hsienjenchang

Colletotrichum metake

Colletotrichum nigrum

Colletotrichum phaseolorum

Colletotrichum pyrifoliae

Colletotrichum rusci

Colletotrichum sydowii

Colletotrichum trichellum

Species names that are no longer valid or have been synonymized 
Colletotrichum arachidis
Colletotrichum capsici
Colletotrichum coffeanum
Colletotrichum crassipes
Colletotrichum derridis
Colletotrichum gossypii
Colletotrichum mangenotii
Colletotrichum sublineolum

References

Further reading
 
 
 
 Hyde, K. D. et al. 2009. Colletotrichum - names in current use. Fungal Diversity 39 147–83.
 
 
 

 
Sordariomycetes genera